Monroe City Hall is a historic city hall building located at Monroe, Union County, North Carolina.  It was built in 1847–1848, is a three-story brick building with interior end chimneys and a gableroof.  It has a slightly projecting, one bay, center pavilion.  A two-story wing was added in the 20th century.  It was originally built as the public jail and is possibly the oldest building in Monroe.

It was listed on the National Register of Historic Places in 1971.

References

City and town halls on the National Register of Historic Places in North Carolina
Government buildings completed in 1847
Buildings and structures in Union County, North Carolina
National Register of Historic Places in Union County, North Carolina
1847 establishments in North Carolina
City and town halls in North Carolina